Two Night Stand is a 2014 American romantic comedy film directed by Max Nichols, written by Mark Hammer, and starring Miles Teller, Lio Tipton, Jessica Szohr, Leven Rambin, and Scott Mescudi.

On November 10, 2013, it was announced that there were two offers for the rights of the film in the US. Entertainment One acquired the rights to distribute the film in the US on November 21, 2013, for a release in 2014.

Plot
Megan is unemployed and single, and one day she joins a dating website. Her roommates, who just want her to move out, invite her to a party at a club. After a bouncer refuses to let her into the club on the grounds that she looks too young and she did not have her ID, she runs into her ex-fiancé, Chris, and later decides to have a one-night stand with one of the men she found on the website, Alec.

The next morning, they are less than cordial to each other, but Megan is unable to leave because of a blizzard. Forced to spend more time together, the two end up telling each other what they did wrong the previous night, convinced that they will never see each other again, and Megan suggests that they "try again". The two have sex again, with far better results.

Afterwards, Megan discovers a closet full of women's clothes, and pictures of Alec with a girl. She finds out that Alec's girlfriend, Daisy, had written a note to him, saying that she wanted to break up, but had not given it to him, but he had found it accidentally. Alec wanted to have something to rub in her face when she broke up with him, and so he had joined the dating website. Angry, Megan leaves.

When Daisy returns, she finds a note that Megan had scribbled, and she and Alec exchange the notes that they had found, and they break up. At a New Year's Eve party, Megan is arrested because the same note was found in Alec's neighbor's apartment, which the two had broken into earlier. Alec arrives to the prison with flowers and balloons. He pays bail, but Megan refuses to see him or even leave the holding cell.

Later, when her roommates come to pay bail, Alec apologizes, saying that he did not know her last name and that this was the only way he thought he could see her again. He says that it might be something that the two of them would laugh about years later, but Megan is still angry because she had to spend time in jail. She makes him a deal, asking for his number and promising to call him the moment she laughed about it. She takes a closer look at the presents he gave her. Minutes later, she starts laughing upon seeing the balloon read "I'm sorry, I'm an asshole" and calls Alec. He meets her outside the police station and they kiss in the middle of the road, when it starts snowing again.

Cast
 Miles Teller as Alec 
 Lio Tipton as Megan
 Jessica Szohr as Faiza
 Scott Mescudi as Cedric
 Leven Rambin as Daisy
 Michael Showalter as Rick Raines
 Josh Salatin as Chris
 Kellyn Lindsay as Becca
 Chris Conroy as Ben
 Joey Lauren Adams as voice of Darella, dating website customer service agent

Production
The plot would eventually mirror a natural disaster the production faced once it came time to shoot. "The script was one out of a hundred where I thought, 'I have to do this movie, Nichols said. "I was intrigued from the very premise. The characters are smart and funny, but the story digs much deeper ... It reminded me of coming-of-age stories from my youth." Nichols read the script, which appeared on The Black List in December 2011, and pitched his vision of the story to producers Beau Flynn, Ruben Fleischer and Adam Yoelin. "I was shooting a Willie Nelson video in Austin, TX in May [2012] and got a call that I [was on board]", said Nichols. "We immediately started casting the film and were lucky to have a lot of talented actors and actresses who were interested, but there was something about [Lio] Tipton's 'Megan' that caught my attention." Nichols said it was "essential" that her character's "date" Alec understand that "he's never met a girl like her and can't let her go." Miles Teller joined the cast soon afterward as Alec and the rest of casting was completed in late summer.

After the primary cast was in place, producers went off "to work their [financing] magic", said Nichols, and the shoot was scheduled for October 2012, which coincided with Hurricane Sandy. "Production had to go down for two days", Nichols said. "After it was over we had the challenge of a gas shortage which meant no power for our generators and trucks." The Two Night Stand shoot was only scheduled to take 19 days and some of the planned locations were without electricity post-storm. "[Lio] and Miles were staying downtown in an apartment and were stranded there without power", added Nichols, giving the actors a real-life parallel to their characters' own predicament. Production managed to recoup its time-loss and Nichols bunkered down with editor Matt Garner at Harbor Picture Company to edit.

Release
Two Night Stand premiered at the American Film Market in early 2014 and distributor eOne came on board soon after its screening at The Grove. The film opened in limited release on September 26, 2014 before release on iTunes and video on demand a week later on October 3.

Critical reception
The film received mixed reviews from critics. On Rotten Tomatoes, the film holds a rating of 38%, based on 47 reviews, with an average rating of 4.89/10. The consensus reads: "Two Night Stand proves even a pair of well-matched leads isn't enough to take a rom-com all the way from interesting idea to watchable feature." On Metacritic, the film has a score of 45 out of 100, based on 17 critics, indicating "mixed or average reviews".

Notes

References

External links
 
 
 
 
 

2014 films
2014 directorial debut films
2014 independent films
2014 romantic comedy films
2010s English-language films
American independent films
American romantic comedy films
Entertainment One films
Films produced by Beau Flynn
Films produced by Ruben Fleischer
Films set in Manhattan
Films shot in New York City
2010s American films